The 12th Delta Operations Squadron (12 DOS) is a United States Space Force unit assigned to Space Training and Readiness Command's Space Delta 12. It leads the delta's headquarters staff and manages cross-functioning processes of squadrons across the delta. It is headquartered at Schriever Space Force Base, Colorado.

List of commanders 

 Lt Col Jonathon R. Noonan, ~16 July 2021

See also 
 Space Delta 12

References

External links 
 

Military education and training in the United States
Squadrons of the United States Space Force